Arline Burks Gant is a director, actress and costume designer. She wrote, produced and directed the international children's video, Manners, and the documentary series The Legends.

Career
In 1995, Arline Burks Gant started Dakota P. Productions to develop films and television programming in High Definition. Arline has written, produced and directed children's videos for international distribution. She also wrote, produced and directed a dramatic short film, "Couture in the Extreme."  Arline directed a 15-minute comedic sitcom, "25 Lighthouse, for cable programming.  In 2012 she directed and produced for stage "Introducing Sepia Girl," and "The Story of Minnie the Moocher."  She is currently in production with "The Upbeat Show" and "Upbeat Kidz Rock" a variety television show across the Midwest Fall 2016.

Gant's professional experiences ~ in front and behind the camera ~ began in her pre-teens as the cover girl for Magnificent Hair Products. During her teen years, she continued runway and print modeling.  She also was a principal dancer for "The Upbeat Show," a nationally syndicated rock and roll music variety television program, before heading to Europe to work as a runway model for several couture houses.

In time, Gant was featured in several films. The Cleveland native started designing her own clothing line, and then opened a factory in Senegal, West Africa.  She gradually shifted into costume design by creating fashion concepts for new recording groups under contract at Motown Records. Her credits include such as "Deep Cover" starring Laurence Fishburne and Jeff Goldblum, and "Daughters of the Dust" directed by Julie Dash, as well as the sitcom, "Martin" for Universal Studios.

Directing and writing
Burks Gant's work also includes:
Get Real (directed)
Beat the Clock (wrote)
We Rock (wrote)
Race to the White House (wrote)
Jeni (wrote)
89th Street Corridor (wrote)
Secret Sec (wrote)
Scream in the Breeze (wrote)

Costume design
Burks Gant has designed costumes for a number of productions including:
Martin Lawrence Show
Daughters of the Dust
Deep Cover
Talented Tenth 
Lovable Blond Seeking
Gloria and Pat
Baldwin Hills Boys
Harmony
AC Black

Achievements
1992 Costume Designer of the Year / 1993 Theatre Awards- Joan and the Zulus

References

External links

Year of birth missing (living people)
Living people
American women film directors
American costume designers
Women costume designers
20th-century American actresses
21st-century American women
American film directors